Wheatland County is a county in the U.S. state of Montana. As of the 2020 census, the population was 2,069. Its county seat is Harlowton.
Wheatland County was established on February 22, 1917, with areas partitioned from Meagher and Sweet Grass counties. It was named for the abundant wheat-growing areas across the center portion of the new county's area.

Geography

Major highways
  U.S. Highway 12
  U.S. Highway 191
  Montana Highway 3

Adjacent counties

 Judith Basin County - north
 Fergus County - north
 Golden Valley County - east
 Sweet Grass County - south
 Meagher County - west

National protected area
 Lewis and Clark National Forest (part)

Demographics

2000 census
As of the 2000 United States census, there were 2,259 people, 853 households, and 540 families in the county. The population density was 2 people per square mile (1/km2). There were 1,154 housing units at an average density of 0.8/square mile (0.3/km2). The racial makeup of the county was 96.99% White, 0.13% Black or African American, 0.58% Native American, 0.18% Asian, 0.22% Pacific Islander, 0.27% from other races, and 1.64% from two or more races. 1.11% of the population were Hispanic or Latino of any race. 38.4% were of German, 11.6% Norwegian, 7.5% English, 7.4% Irish and 6.5% American ancestry. 87.4% spoke English and 12.2% German as their first language.

There were 853 households, out of which 25.80% had children under the age of 18 living with them, 53.80% were married couples living together, 4.90% had a female householder with no husband present, and 36.60% were non-families. 34.50% of all households were made up of individuals, and 16.40% had someone living alone who was 65 years of age or older. The average household size was 2.24 and the average family size was 2.86.

The county population contained 26.80% under the age of 18, 6.40% from 18 to 24, 22.00% from 25 to 44, 25.50% from 45 to 64, and 19.30% who were 65 years of age or older. The median age was 41 years. For every 100 females there were 98.00 males. For every 100 females age 18 and over, there were 99.20 males.

The median income for a household in the county was $24,492, and the median income for a family was $32,500. Males had a median income of $14,185 versus $15,000 for females. The per capita income for the county was $11,954. About 11.10% of families and 20.40% of the population were below the poverty line, including 16.00% of those under age 18 and 15.50% of those age 65 or over.

2010 census
As of the 2010 United States census, there were 2,168 people, 887 households, and 538 families in the county. The racial makeup of the county was 95.8% white, 0.6% Asian, 0.5% American Indian, 0.3% black or African American, 0.4% from other races, and 2.4% from two or more races. Those of Hispanic or Latino origin made up 1.5% of the population. In terms of ancestry, 35.2% were American, 22.7% were German, 14.1% were English, 11.5% were Irish, and 6.6% were Norwegian.

Of the 887 households, 23.7% had children under the age of 18 living with them, 50.8% were married couples living together, 6.4% had a female householder with no husband present, 39.3% were non-families, and 35.4% of all households were made up of individuals. The average household size was 2.28 and the average family size was 2.99. The median age was 44.9 years.

The median income for a household in the county was $30,321 and the median income for a family was $41,161. Males had a median income of $30,769 versus $17,083 for females. The per capita income for the county was $18,474. About 5.1% of families and 11.5% of the population were below the poverty line, including 8.8% of those under age 18 and 27.6% of those age 65 or over.

Politics
Wheatland County voters have selected the Republican Party candidate in every national election since 1964 (as of 2020).

Communities

Cities
 Harlowton (county seat)
 Judith Gap

Census-designated places
 Duncan Ranch Colony
 Martinsdale Colony
 Shawmut
 Springwater Colony
 Twodot

Other unincorporated communities
 Hedgesville
 Living Springs

See also
 List of lakes in Wheatland County, Montana
 List of mountains in Wheatland County, Montana
 National Register of Historic Places listings in Wheatland County MT

References

 
1917 establishments in Montana
Populated places established in 1917